Ditropis whitei is a species of land snails with opercula, terrestrial gastropods in the family Cyclophoridae.
This species is endemic to Australia.

References

Cyclophoridae
Gastropods of Australia
Vulnerable fauna of Australia
Gastropods described in 1874
Taxonomy articles created by Polbot